Pöögle is a village in Mulgi Parish in Viljandi County in southern Estonia. It borders the villages Leeli and Allaste as well as other villages in the former parishes of Abja and Halliste.

References

Villages in Viljandi County
Kreis Pernau